The 32 federal states of Mexico are ranked below according to population, size, population density, and GDP.

By population

Total population based on data from the 2020 National Population Census.

By area

Total continental surface based on data from the 2020 National Population Census.

By population density

Population density based on data from the 2020 National Census.

By Gross domestic product

Nominal GDP in 2019 based on latest data from Mexico's National Accounts System, INEGI.

By GDP (PPP) per capita

GDP (PPP) per capita in 2018 based on latest data from OECD Statistics.

See also 

States of Mexico

References

Mexico
States, ranked
Ranked